Roettger or Röttger is a surname. Notable people with the surname include:

Norman Charles Roettger, Jr. (1930–2003), American lawyer and judge
Oscar Roettger (1900–1986), American first baseman and right-handed pitcher
Timo Röttger (born 1985), German footballer
Wally Roettger (1902–1951), professional baseball player
Wilhelm Röttger (1894–1946), German executioner
William Röttger (1948–2015), German label manager, music manager and gallery owner
Wolfgang Röttger, German politician (German Christian Democratic Union)